Ban of Slavonia or the Ban of "Whole Slavonia" was the title of the governor of a territory part of the medieval Kingdom of Hungary and Kingdom of Croatia.

In the Kingdom of Croatia, Demetrius Zvonimir was the only notable person that ruled over the region of Slavonia with the title ban from around 1070 until 1075. From 1102, the title Ban of Croatia was appointed by the kings of Hungary, and there was at first a single ban for all of the Kingdom of Croatia, but later the Slavonian domain got a separate ban. It included parts of present-day Central Croatia, western Slavonia and parts of northern Bosnia and Herzegovina. From 1225, the title started being held by a separate dignitary from the title of the Ban of Croatia and Dalmatia, and existed until 1476, when it was joined with the latter title.

In the 13th and 14th centuries, the more extensive title of Duke of Slavonia was granted, mainly to relatives of Hungarian monarchs or other major noblemen.

According to the public law of the Kingdom of Hungary, bans were counted among the "barons of the realm" and thus they enjoyed several privileges connected to their office.

Bans of "Whole Slavonia"

See also 

 Duke of Slavonia
 Ban of Croatia
 Slavonia
 Kingdom of Slavonia
 Croatia-Slavonia
 Slavonian Krajina

External links
List of rulers

Croatian nobility
Barons of the realm (Kingdom of Hungary)
History of Slavonia
Banates of the Kingdom of Hungary